Sin'gye County is a county in North Hwanghae province, North Korea.  It is a mining district with abandoned molybdenum and copper mines.

Climate

Administrative divisions
Sin'gye county is divided into 1 ŭp (town) and 27 ri (villages):

Transport
Sin'gye county is served by three stations on the Ch'ŏngnyŏn Ich'ŏn line of the Korean State Railway.

References

Counties of North Hwanghae